Schizodon is a genus of headstander from South America. Though found widely in tropical freshwater habitats in the continent, the greatest species richness is in the Paraná–Paraguay–Uruguay river basin. They are herbivorous, feeding on fruits, seeds, algae, macrophytes, leaves and roots.

Species
There are currently 16 described species in this genus.

Schizodon altoparanae Garavello & Britski, 1990
Schizodon australis Garavello, 1994
Schizodon borellii (Boulenger, 1900)
Schizodon corti L. P. Schultz, 1944
Schizodon dissimilis (Garman, 1890)
Schizodon fasciatus Spix & Agassiz, 1829
Schizodon intermedius Garavello & Britski, 1990
Schizodon isognathus Kner, 1858
Schizodon jacuiensis Bergmann, 1988
Schizodon knerii (Steindachner, 1875)
Schizodon nasutus Kner, 1858
Schizodon platae (Garman, 1890)
Schizodon rostratus (Borodin, 1931)
Schizodon scotorhabdotus Sidlauskas, Garavello & Jellen, 2007
Schizodon succinctus Burmeister, 1861
Schizodon vittatus (Valenciennes, 1850)

References

Anostomidae
Taxa_named_by_Louis_Agassiz
Fish of South America